Cherry Blossom is a type of chocolate confection in Canada produced by the Canadian subsidiary of Hershey. "Hershey Canada Inc." used to produce it at its Canadian manufacturing facility in Smiths Falls, Ontario.

History 

The candy had been manufactured since the 1890s by the Walter M. Lowney Company of Canada which was taken over by Hershey as a subsidiary brand. The facility in Smiths Falls, northeast of Kingston, is now closed.

A prominent man in Mansfield, Massachusetts, Lowney opened and operated his candy factory in the city, being also involved in the development of other interests in the city. In the mid 1890s a subsidiary of Lowney Co. was opened in Canada. The company continued to grow and so did the Cherry Blossom.

In the mid-20th century, Hershey bought out the Smiths Falls factory and began manufacturing Cherry Blossoms. The plant remained active for 45 years until it closed in 2008.

Information 
The Cherry Blossom consists of a maraschino cherry and cherry syrup surrounded by a mixture of chocolate, shredded coconut and roasted peanut pieces. The candy is sold in an individually wrapped 45-gram (1½ oz) portion, packaged in a close-fitting cardboard box.

Contrary to common myth, filling is not injected inside the chocolate. The cherry candy is coated with an enzyme, invertase, that breaks down the solid into a liquid over the next 1 to 2 weeks. 

The Cherry Blossom candy provides 210 calories of food energy. It contains 10g fat (15%Daily), 29g carbohydrate (10%Daily), 1g fibre (4%Daily), 27g Sugars and a further 2 grams of protein.

See also
 List of chocolate bar brands
 List of cherry dishes

References

 

The Hershey Company brands
Canadian confectionery